Robert Douglass Montgomery (also credited as Kent Douglass; October 29, 1909 – July 23, 1966) was an American film actor.

Early years
The son of Chester Montgomery, a jeweler, Montgomery graduated from Los Angeles High School.

Career 
Montgomery used the stage name Douglass Montgomery when he began acting in New York. He usually appeared as a male ingenue or leading man. 

He gained early acting experience at the Pasadena Community Playhouse.

The film phase of his career began at M-G-M in 1930, playing the second male lead in films such as Paid and Five and Ten. When he signed his contract at the studio his name was changed to Kent Douglass, to avoid confusion with that studio's star Robert Montgomery. Upon leaving MGM in 1932, he changed it back to Douglass Montgomery.

Among his most celebrated roles was Laurie in Little Women (1933), opposite  Katharine Hepburn's Jo March.  He also played Johnny Hollis ("Johnny-in-the-Clouds") in The Way to the Stars (1945).

After serving in the Royal Canadian Air Force during World War II, Montgomery moved to Great Britain and made films there. He later returned to the U.S. and appeared in a number of television shows.

Marriage
Montgomery married British actress Kay Young (born Kathleen Tamar Young) on March 14, 1952, at Bethlehem Federated Church. He was her second husband. Young had divorced film actor Michael Wilding the year before she wed  Montgomery. (Wilding remarried in 1952, to Hollywood star Elizabeth Taylor.) Young and Montgomery remained married until his death.

Death
Douglass Montgomery died of spinal cancer in Norwalk, Connecticut, at age 56, on July 23, 1966. He was cremated, with his ashes given to his widow.

Filmography

Paid (1930) UK title: Within the Law as Bob (credited as Kent Douglass)
Daybreak (1931) as Von Lear
Five and Ten (1931) as Avery Rarick (credited as Kent Douglass)
Waterloo Bridge (1931) as Roy Cronin (credited as Kent Douglass)
A House Divided (1931) as Matt Law
Little Women (1933) as Theodore "Laurie" Laurence
Eight Girls in a Boat (1934) as David Perrin
Little Man, What Now? (1934) as Hans Pinneberg
Music in the Air (1934) as Karl Roder
The Mystery of Edwin Drood (1935) as Neville Landless
Lady Tubbs (1935) as Phil Ash-Orcutt
Harmony Lane (1935) as Stephen Foster
Everything Is Thunder (1936) as Hugh McGrath
Tropical Trouble (1936) as George Masterman
Life Begins With Love (1937) as William Addington Drake IV
Counsel for Crime (1937) as Paul Maddox
The Cat and the Canary (1939) as Charlie Wilder
The Way to the Stars UK (1945) (US title Johnny in the Clouds)
Woman to Woman UK (1947) as David Anson
 Fatal Symphony  Italy (1947) (When in Rome) as John Savage
Forbidden  UK (1949) as Jim Harding

Television appearances
Hallmark Hall of Fame (1951)
Cameo Theatre (1952) - Peer Gynt
Robert Montgomery Presents (1952)
Kraft Television Theater (1954)

References

Also see

External links

1909 births
1966 deaths
American male film actors
Deaths from cancer in Connecticut
Male actors from Los Angeles
Actors from Norwalk, Connecticut
20th-century American male actors
RKO Pictures contract players